The Ginásio Poliesportivo Wlamir Marques (English: Wlamir Marques Multi-sport Gymnasium), previously known as the Ginásio Poliesportivo Parque São Jorge (São Jorge Park Multi-sport Gymnasium), is a multipurpose indoor arena that is located in the Tatuapé district of São Paulo, Brazil. It is a part of the Parque São Jorge multi-sports complex. The arena is primarily used to host futsal games, for which it has a seating capacity of 7,000 people.

History
The arena opened in May 1963. It hosted the original Test Tournament of the FIBA Intercontinental Cup, in July 1965, in which the local club, S.C. Corinthians Paulista, beat the Spanish Primera División club Real Madrid, by a score of 118–109. Over the years, the arena has been used as the home arena of the professional basketball team S.C. Corinthians Paulista, of the Brazilian League (NBB).

The arena was named after the well-known Brazilian basketball player, Wlamir Marques, in October 2016.

Major sporting events held at the arena

References

External links
"GINÁSIO POLIESPORTIVO WLAMIR MARQUES" - SPORT CLUB CORINTHIANS PAULISTA 
Wlamir Marques visita ginásio e dá sua bênção para o jogo 2 da final entre Paulistano e Mogi 

Basketball venues in Brazil
Buildings and structures in São Paulo
Handball venues in Brazil
Indoor arenas in Brazil
Multi-purpose stadiums in Brazil
Sport in São Paulo
Volleyball venues in Brazil